Graydancer's Ropecast is a podcast devoted to the art of erotic rope bondage with an emphasis on Japanese bondage. The podcast has been in continuous production since 2005.

The podcast is produced by Graydancer in Madison, Wisconsin. The A.V. Club called Graydancer "one of the region's leading sex educators," and featured his website as a prelude to Valentine's day.

A typical episode includes announcements of upcoming rope bondage events, listener mail, a discussion on topics of interest to the BDSM community, and occasionally an extended interview with  luminaries of the BDSM community. In the past, the interview has featured Jay Wiseman, Claire Adams, Mollena Wiliams, Twisted Monk, Cunning Minx, and Tristan Taormino, among others.

References

External links 

Audio podcasts
BDSM
2005 podcast debuts
BDSM-related mass media